Espionage is the fourth and final album released by rap group Steady Mobb'n (spelled as Steady Mobbin on the cover). It was released independently through Big Body Entertainment and was produced by Harm, Ronski and Poe. The album featured guest appearances from fellow Californian rappers B-Legit, Delinquents, Keak da Sneak and Too $hort.

Track listing

Personnel
 Billy Bathgate - primary artist
 Crooked Eye - primary artist
 B-Legit - guest artist
 The Delinquents - guest artist
 Keak da Sneak - guest artist
 Too Short - guest artist, composer
 Sho Dawg - guest artist
 Jerry Turner - guest artist
 Young Gunz - guest artist
 Nephews - guest artist
 Squeeze - guest artist
 Double R - guest artist
 Willie Young - executive producer
 Harm - producer
 Poe - producer
 Ronski - producer
 Glenn Tilbrook - composer
 Chris Difford - composer

References

2003 albums
Steady Mobb'n albums